Dorothea Maria Irene Liebermann-Meffert (6 May 1930 – 3 September 2020) was a German surgeon and professor of surgery at the Technical University of Munich.

Early life 
Liebermann-Meffert was born on 6 May 1930 in Rastatt, Germany, to Karl Peter and Irene (née Wrede) Meffert. She received the degree of Doctor of Medicine at the University of Freiburg in 1958.

Career 
 1958 Resident District Hospital, Bad Säckingen
 1959 Pediatric Surgery, University Zürich
 1960–1964  Diakonie Hospital, Freiburg
 1965–1969 Senior resident, associate professor, Anatomy University Institute, Germany
 1970–1987 Associate professor University Hospital general surgery, Basel
 1987–2002 Professor surgery, Technical University of Munich
 2003–2004 Professor clinical surgery, University of Southern California, Los Angeles
 2004 Professor surgery, Technical University of Munich
Liebermann-Meffert became known for her 1999 biography with Hubert J. Stein of Rudolf Nissen, inventor of the Nissen fundoplication.

Personal life 
Liebermann-Meffert married Eduard Karl Heinz Liebermann. Together they have four children.

Selected publications
 Rudolf Nissen and the World Revolution of Fundoplication. Johann Ambrosius Barth Verlag, Heidelberg, 1999. (With Hubert J. Stein)
 A Century of International Progress and Tradition in Surgery: An Illustrated History of the International Society of Surgery. Kaden Verlag, Heidelberg, 2001. (Jointly with Harvey White)

References

External links 
Research Gate - Dorothea Liebermann-Meffert's scientific contributions while affiliated with Technische Universität München (Munich, Germany)

1936 births
2020 deaths
German medical writers
Women medical writers
German surgeons
Women surgeons
University of Southern California faculty
Academic staff of the Technical University of Munich
University of Freiburg alumni